Beata Grażyna Dziadura (born 11 December 1952) is a Polish rower. She competed in the women's single sculls event at the 1980 Summer Olympics.

References

1952 births
Living people
Polish female rowers
Olympic rowers of Poland
Rowers at the 1980 Summer Olympics
Sportspeople from Gdańsk